Max (Masse) Zimmermann (born February 14, 1994) is a German professional Canadian football wide receiver who is a wide receiver for the Berlin Thunder in the European League of Football. He was born in Germany and played in the German Football League before being signed by the Saskatchewan Roughriders of the Canadian Football League (CFL).

Early life and education
Zimmerman was born on February 14, 1994, in Berlin, Germany. He went to college at Potsdam.

Professional career

Potsdam Royals
He started his career with the Potsdam Royals of the German Football League in 2017. He played there from 2017 to 2018. In 2017, he played on the Germany national American football team. In his two seasons with the Royals, he played in 21 games and had 60 receptions for 1,242 yards and 18 touchdowns. They won the 2018 EFL Bowl.

Saskatchewan Roughriders
In 2019, he was picked as 1 of 18 European players to attend the 2019 CFL Combine. Zimmermann was drafted in the 2019 CFL European Draft by the Saskatchewan Roughriders. He spent most of the season on the practice squad but he did make one appearance. He did not have any statistics in his one game. He was released on June 21, 2021.

Kuopio Steelers
When the 2020 CFL season was canceled, players were allowed to play in other leagues. Zimmermann went to the Kuopio Steelers in a Finland football league. The Steelers would later win the league championship.

References

External links
Behind The Grind: Roughrider Max Zimmermann Prepares for Camp!

1994 births
Living people
Saskatchewan Roughriders players
German players of Canadian football
Sportspeople from Berlin
Canadian football wide receivers
Berlin Thunder (ELF) players